Vermeijius virginiae is a species of sea snail, a marine gastropod mollusk in the family Fasciolariidae, the spindle snails, the tulip snails and their allies.

Description

Distribution
This marine species occurs in the Mozambique Channel.

References

 Hadorn R. & Fraussen K. (2002) Two new Fusinus from East Africa (Gastropoda: Fasciolariidae). Iberus 20(1): 63-72.

External links
 Kantor Y.I., Fedosov A.E., Snyder M.A. & Bouchet P. (2018). Pseudolatirus Bellardi, 1884 revisited, with the description of two new genera and five new species (Neogastropoda: Fasciolariidae). European Journal of Taxonomy. 433: 1-57

virginiae
Gastropods described in 2002